In manufacturing, andon is a system which notifies managerial, maintenance, and other workers of a quality or process problem. The alert can be activated manually by a worker using a pullcord or button or may be activated automatically by the production equipment itself. The system may include a means to pause production so the issue can be corrected. Some modern alert systems incorporate audio alarms, text, or other displays; stack lights are among the most commonly used. 

“Andon” is a loanword from Japanese, originally meaning paper lantern; Japanese manufacturers began its quality-control usage.

Details

An andon system is one of the principal elements of the Jidoka quality control method pioneered by Toyota as part of the Toyota Production System and therefore now part of the lean production approach. 

The principle of Andon works as such: if there are any production issues happening in Production line, the affected work station operator will need to trigger alert by pulling down the andon cord. But since 2014, Toyota is slowly replacing the andon cord  with "andon button" as it can be operated wirelessly and reduce the clutter mess of tangling cables in production floor which leads to avoidance of tripping incidents in production floor. It gives workers the ability, and moreover the empowerment, to stop production when a defect is found, and immediately call for assistance. Common reasons for manual activation of the andon are:
 Part shortage
 Defects created or found
 Tools/machines malfunction
 Existence of a safety problem.

All work in production line is stopped until a solution has been found. The alerts may be logged to a database so that they can be studied as part of a continual improvement process. Once the problem is troubleshot and fixed, a second pull of the andon cord authorizes the production to be resumed.

The system typically indicates where the alert was generated, and may also provide a description of the issue. Modern andon systems can include text, graphics, or audio elements. Audio alerts may be done with coded tones, music with different tunes corresponding to the various alerts, or prerecorded verbal messages.

History
The concept/process of giving a non-management (production line) worker the authority to stop the production line because of a suspected quality issue is often attributed to W. Edwards Deming and others who developed what became Kaizen after World War II.  Many attribute Japan's rise from wartime ashes to the world's second largest economy (the Japanese economic miracle) to their post-war industrial innovations:

 Better design of products to improve service
 Higher level of uniform product quality
 Improvement of product testing in the workplace and in research centers
 Greater sales through side [global] markets

See also
 
 Stack light (commonly used in andon and lean manufacturing initiatives)

References

Japanese business terms
Lean manufacturing
Manufacturing in Japan